The Greatest Remixes Collection is a compilation of Bananarama remixes released exclusively in Southeast Asia in 1990. At the time of the release, the only mix that had not been issued on CD was the Miami Mix of "I Heard a Rumour", although none of the mixes had ever been compiled on a Bananarama album. Subsequently some of the mixes have been available on easier to find Bananarama albums, such as The Very Best of Bananarama double CD or The Twelve Inches of Bananarama. The album has become very rare and expensive.

Track listing
 "Cruel Summer '89" (Swing Beat Dub) – 5:20
(S. Jolley/T. Swain/S. Dallin/S. Fahey/ K. Woodward)
Remixed by Freddy Bastone
 "Megarama '89" (Full-Length Version) – 8:37
Megamix and additional production by Alan Coulthard for DMC (UK)
 "Help!" (Extended Version) – 6:33
(J. Lennon/P. McCartney)
 "Love in the First Degree" (Jailers Mix) – 6:05
(S. Dallin/S. Fahey/K. Woodward/M. Stock/ M. Aitken/P. Waterman)
 "I Heard a Rumour" (Miami Mix) – 7:10
(S. Dallin/S. Fahey/K. Woodward/M. Stock/ M. Aitken/P. Waterman)
Remixed by Phil Harding
 "I Want You Back" (Extended European Mix) – 7:58
(S. Dallin/S. Fahey/K. Woodward/M. Stock/ M. Aitken/P. Waterman)
 "Nathan Jones" (Extended Version) – 5:13
(K. Wakefield/L. Caston)
 "Love, Truth and Honesty" (Dance Hall Version) – 7:24
(S. Dallin/J. O'Sullivan/K. Woodward/M. Stock/ M. Aitken/P. Waterman)
 "Venus" (The Greatest Remix) – 7:55
(R. Van Leeuwen)
Remixed by Phil Harding & Ian Curnow

Personnel
Bananarama
Sara Dallin – Vocals 
Siobhan Fahey – Vocals on "Love in the First Degree", "I Heard a Rumour" and "Venus"
Jacquie O'Sullivan – Vocals on "Cruel Summer '89", "Help!", "I Want You Back", "Nathan Jones" and "Love, Truth and Honesty"
Keren Woodward – Vocals

Additional personnel
Grace Tsang – Album and artwork design

Bananarama compilation albums
1990 remix albums
1990 greatest hits albums
London Records remix albums